The National Arts Merit Awards (NAMA Awards) is a set of annual awards granted by the National Arts Council of Zimbabwe (NACZ) in recognition of outstanding achievements in the arts and culture.

The categories have differed over the years. In 2020, they were:
 Outstanding Newcomer
 Outstanding Female Musician
 Outstanding Male Musician
 Outstanding Song
 Outstanding Album
 Outstanding Music Video
 Outstanding Fiction Book
 Outstanding Children's Book
 Outstanding First Creative Published Book
 Outstanding Female Dance
 Outstanding Male Dancer
 Outstanding Actress
 Outstanding Screen Production (Television Series)
 Outstanding Screen Production – Short Film
 Outstanding Mix Media Work
 Outstanding 2 Dimensional Work
 Outstanding 3 Dimensional Work
 Outstanding Exhibition
 Outstanding Journalist (Print)
 Outstanding Journalist (TV)
 Outstanding Journalist Radio
 Outstanding Online Media
 Outstanding Comedian
 Outstanding Poet
 Outstanding Actor (Film and TV)
 Outstanding Actress (Film and TV)
 Outstanding Screen Production (TV)
 Outstanding Screen Production (Short Film)
 Outstanding Screen Production (Full-length Film)
 Outstanding Promoter of the Year
 Personality of the Year
 Service to the Arts Award
 Lifetime Achievement Award
 People's Choice Award

Awards winners

2020
 Outstanding fiction book: Out of Darkness, Shining Light – Petina Gappah

2010
 Outstanding Fiction Book: The Fading Sun – David Mungoshi

2009
 Outstanding Fiction Book: Ndafa Here? – Ignatius Mabasa

2008
 Outstanding Fiction Book: The Uncertainty of Hope – Valerie Tagwira

2007
 Outstanding Fiction Book: Strife – Shimmer Chinodya

2006
 Outstanding Fiction: Totanga Patsva – Memory Chirere

2005
Outstanding Fiction: Masimba – Chiedza Musengezi

2004
 Best Fiction Book: Noma Kanjani Kayiphele Linto! – Bekithemba Ncube

2003
 Best Written Work – Yvonne Vera

2002
 Best Written Work in any language: Umsebenzi Kawukho  – N.C.G. Mathema

References 

Zimbabwean awards
Lists of awards
Zimbabwe-related lists
Arts in Zimbabwe